Blue Seduction is a 2009 Canadian erotic thriller directed by Timothy Bond and starring Billy Zane and Estella Warren. It was filmed in New Brunswick, Canada.

Plot
Mikey Taylor is a once-famous rock star in long-time retirement. Everything was as usual in his previous life—parties, drugs, casual sex with different women, until he met his future wife Joyce, a broker in a reputable real estate company, who helped him cope with his dangerous addictions. However, along comes his big fan, a gorgeous young woman, who wants to use him to become famous herself. To achieve her goal, she seduces Mikey with alcohol, cocaine, and rough sex, leading him to his near self-destruction.

Cast
 Billy Zane as Mikey Taylor 
 Estella Warren as Matty 
 Jane Wheeler as Joyce 
 Bernard Robichaud as Stanley 
 Robbie O'Neill as Dickie Kline 
 Elizabeth Stevens as Jan

Review

—Brett Cullum, DVD Verdict

References

External links

2009 films
English-language Canadian films
2000s erotic thriller films
Canadian erotic thriller films
Films shot in New Brunswick
2009 thriller films
Films directed by Timothy Bond
2000s English-language films
2000s Canadian films